Thirumanancheri (Thiru Manam Cheri) is a village located near Cauvery River in Mayiladuthurai district. The village name comes from the god Shiva.

References

Cities and towns in Mayiladuthurai district